Aspartame-acesulfame salt is an artificial sweetener marketed under the name Twinsweet. It is produced by soaking a 2-1 mixture of aspartame and acesulfame potassium in an acidic solution and allowing it to crystallize; moisture and potassium are removed during this process. It is approximately 350 times as sweet as sucrose. It has been given the E number E962.

History

Aspartame-acesulfame salt was invented in 1995 by sweetener expert Dr John Fry while working for The Holland Sweetener Company (HSC), a subsidiary of DSM. HSC marketed it with the name Twinsweet. It was approved for use as an artificial sweetener in the European Parliament and Council Directive 94/35 EC as amended by Directive 2003/ 115/ EC in 2003. In North America it falls under the same regulations as aspartame and acesulfame-K. It is also approved for use in China, Russia, Hong-Kong, Australia and New Zealand.

In December 2006 HSC ceased all of its aspartame operations, citing a glut in the market driving prices below profitable values. The rights to aspartame-acesulfame are now owned by The NutraSweet Company Inc who have continued to market the sweetener successfully in the USA and EU.

References

External links

Holland Sweetener Company

Sugar substitutes
Food science
Oxathiazines
E-number additives